Rift.Canyon.Dreams is the second EP by the U.S. doom metal band Burning Witch. It was originally released in 1998 on Merciless Records, to a limited distribution of 500 copies. It is available on the compilation Crippled Lucifer (Seven Psalms for Our Lord of Light), through Southern Lord Records.

Track listing
 "Warning Signs" – 8:22	
 "Stillborn" – 11:57
 "History of Hell (Crippled Lucifer)" – 6:03
 "Communion" – 8:43

Personnel
Stephen O'Malley – guitar
G. Stuart Dahlquist – bass
B.R.A.D. – drums
Edgy 59 – vocals

References

1998 EPs
Burning Witch albums
Southern Lord Records EPs